The Tuhsis were a medieval Turkic-speaking tribe, who lived alongside the Chigil, Yagma, and other tribes, in Zhetysu and today southern Kazakhstan. Tuhsi were also considered remnants of the Türgesh people.<ref>Gumilyov, L. Searches for an Imaginary Kingdom: The trefoil of the Bird's Eye View' Ch. 5: The Shattered Silence (961-1100)</ref> Turkologist Yury Zuev noted a nation (國) named 觸水昆 (Mand. Chùshuǐkūn < *t͡ɕʰɨok̚-ɕˠiuɪX-kuən) in Jiu Tangshu,Zuev Yu.A., "Horse Tamgas from Vassal Princedoms (translation of Chinese composition "Tanghuiyao" of the 8th to 10th centuries)", Kazakh SSR Academy of Sciences, Alma-Ata, 1960, pp. 124 (in Russian). so he reconstructed 觸水昆 as *Tuhsi-kun; however, Nurlan Kenzheakhmet noted that Tongdian's authors transcribed the same ethnonym as 觸木昆 (Mand. Chùmùkūn < *t͡ɕʰɨok̚-muk̚-kuən), the name of a Duolu Turk tribe, also transcribed as 處木昆 (Chǔmùkūn < t͡ɕʰɨʌX-muk̚-kuən). Even so, it's unclear whether the ethnonym Tuhsi is of Turkic origin. Tuhsi may be connected to Cuman clan Toqsoba, if Toqsoba did not derive from Common Turkic toquz "nine" and oba "clan". Hungarian orientalist Karoly Czeglédy compares the name Tuhsi to that of a medieval Eastern Iranian-speaking Alano-AsAlemany, Agustí (2000). Sources on the Alans: A Critical Compilation. BRILL. p. 1-7 tribe Duχs-Aṣ'', located in the North Caucasus by ibn Rustah, and proposes that Tuhsis had been of Iranian-speaking As origins.

Whatever their origins, by the 11-century, Tuhsis led a nomadic lifestyle amongst the Turkic peoples and on the steppe, possessed a Turkic culture, and their language belonged to the Turkic language family. According to Karakhanid lexicographer Mahmud of Kashgar, contemporary Tuhsis were Turkic-speaking monoglots; after carefully analyzing linguistic materials collected from Tuhsi dialect, he praised the Tuhsi Turkic dialect, among others, for being "pure" and "most correct", both in terms of accent and vocabulary.

Notes

References

Turkic peoples of Asia